Noorena Shams (born 18 June 1997) is a Pakistani sportsperson. She has been a cyclist, a cricketer and a squash player.

Early life
Shams was born on 18 June 1997 in Timergara, Lower Dir District, Pakistan. She raised the money to buy her first squash racket and shoes by selling her cartoons to the local newspaper. She lived in Lower Dir with her mother during the War in Northwest Pakistan, and her house was struck twice. At the age of 15, Shams disguised as a boy to play cricket, and played for a whole year on the national junior team, and then ended up in the girls’ team when her identity was revealed. She played for a short while on the cricket team before moving onto squash.

Sportswoman
Shams has been a sportsperson since 2008. She was the first ever cyclist to win a silver medal for Pakistan in the Junior Olympics. Shams has played different sports and has won 63 gold medals, 24 silver medals and 5 bronze medals. As a squash player, Shams has been among the Top 40 Asian Junior Squash Players, and is currently ranked 209 in the world. She is currently World Number 212 by the Professional Squash Association. She is coached by Munawar Zaman, Shahzad Mohibullah Khan, Adil Khan and Tariq Khan.

Shams won silver in cycling at the junior olympics and is the youngest South Asian to do so.

Activism 
Shams was listed among the 100 Inspirational Women by Paparazzi Magazine in 2016. She was on the list of 50 Influential Ladies of Pakistan in 2016 and was listed among the 24 Inspirational Figures of Pakistan in 2016 by the UNDP.  She also featured in the “BEAT ME” video by UNWOMEN, and was awarded with a Government Pendent of Recognition in 2016. Shams works against harassment in sports and against harassment of female Muslim athletes around the world.  She delivered a TEDxTalk in 2016. Shams received the Gul Jee Art Award several times. She is a 3-time All Pakistan debating champion. She has credited her father as her inspiration for debating, however she has not competed in debating since 2014. Shams was also invited by Malala Fund to address the UN Commission on the Status of Women in 2017, focusing on women’s economic empowerment.

References

External links
 

Living people
1997 births
Pakistani female cyclists
Pakistani cricketers
Pakistani female squash players